Watson is an unincorporated community and census-designated place (CDP) in Livingston Parish, Louisiana, United States. The community is in the Baton Rouge Metropolitan Statistical Area.

History
Watson Post Office was established on February 20, 1894, by George A. Watson. The first Live Oak School was built in 1895 on land donated by Rev. Joel Ott. Several buildings were used for classes there, until the present site was purchased and a two-story school built. Published histories of Live Oak Methodist Church state that the first church was built not more than a quarter-mile from the present site prior to the Civil War. It was destroyed by Union soldiers. The church history states that W.C. Newsom, Huff Jones, George Nesom, J.B. Easterly and James Chandler erected a new building shortly after the Civil War fire. In 1893, under the pastorate of J.P. Haney of the Mississippi Conference, the frame church that was used until 1950 was constructed. As of April 2011, there are three churches in Watson, the oldest turned into a thrift store. The newest, finished in late 2010, is by far the tallest.

Since Watson is unincorporated, Watson's ZIP code of 70786 is available only to post office box recipients. All other residences and businesses use a mailing address for Denham Springs.

Geography
Watson is located in northwest Livingston Parish at  (30.575, -90.953). The village is north of Denham Springs and is situated around the intersection of Range Road (LA 16) and Springfield Road (LA 1019). LA 16 forms the western border of the CDP; the highway leads south  to Denham Springs and northeast  to Amite City.

Climate
Watson is located in a humid, subtropical region. The mild, short, wet, and somewhat warm winters are followed by long, hot, humid, and fairly wet summers.

Demographics

Education
Watson is within the Livingston Parish Public Schools system and is served by:
 Live Oak High School
Live Oak Junior High School
 Live Oak Middle School
 Live Oak Elementary (Watson)
 North Live Oak Elementary
 South Live Oak Elementary

References

External links
 Google Map of Watson
 Source for History Information
 Live Oak Elementary
 Live Oak Middle
 Live Oak High School
 North Live Oak Elementary
 South Live Oak Elementary

Unincorporated communities in Louisiana
Census-designated places in Livingston Parish, Louisiana
Baton Rouge metropolitan area
Census-designated places in Louisiana
Unincorporated communities in Livingston Parish, Louisiana